Matelassé is a weaving or stitching technique yielding a pattern that appears quilted or padded.
Matelassé may be achieved by hand, on a jacquard loom, or using a quilting machine. It is meant to mimic the style of hand-stitched quilts made in Marseilles, France. It is a heavy, thick textile that appears to be padded but actually has no padding within the fabric.

References

Figured fabrics
Textile techniques